Jack Cutting may refer to:
 Jack Cutting (animator) (1908–1988), American animator
 Jack Cutting (footballer) (1924–1985), English footballer

See also
John Cutting (disambiguation)